The 2018 East Kalimantan gubernatorial election took place on 27 June 2018 as part of the simultaneous local elections. It was held to elect the governor of East Kalimantan along with their deputy, whilst members of the provincial council (Dewan Perwakilan Rakyat Daerah) will be re-elected in 2019.

With incumbent Awang Faroek Ishak having served two terms, former regent of East Kutai won a four-way race with 31 percent of the votes. Other candidates are mayors of Samarinda Syaharie Ja'ang and Bontang Andi Sofyan Hasdam, in addition to the provincial secretary Rusmadi Wongso.

Timeline
Registration for party-backed candidates were opened between 8 and 10 January 2018, while independent candidates were required to register earlier in late 2017. The final voter count was set at 2,330,156 in June 2018. The campaigning period would commence between 15 February and 24 June, with a three-day election silence before voting on 27 June.

Candidates

Two-term former Bontang mayor Andi Sofyan Hasdam ran with the backing of Golkar and Nasdem. Hasdam initially ran with Nasdem member Nusyirwan Ismail, but the latter passed away before the election and was replaced by Rizal Effendi, Balikpapan mayor.

Another mayor, Syaharie Ja'ang of Samarinda, also ran in the election with the support of Demokrat, PPP and PKB. His running mate Awang Ferdian Hidayat was a People's Representative Council member from PDI-P.

Former regent of East Kutai, Isran Noor, received the backing of Gerindra, PAN, and PKS. He ran with PKS People's Representative Council member Hadi Mulyadi.

PDI-P and Hanura supported Rusmadi Wongso-Safaruddin, who were the provincial secretary and a police inspector general, respectively.

Results

References

East Kalimantan
2018 Indonesian gubernatorial elections